is a 2003 theatrical compilation of five short film thrillers by five different Japanese directors. This compilation concept's official name is "Omnibus Action Movie".

Short films
, directed by Kazuhiro Kiuchi
, directed by Shundo Ohkawa
, directed by Takanori Tsujimoto
, directed by Shuji Kawata
, directed by Mamoru Oshii

Releases

Book
 2003.06.14: Perfect guidebook Five Bullet On Killers (104p.)

Audio
 2003.06.10: Killers Original Soundtrack (KILL-1, 21 tracks)

Video
 2003.XX.XX: Rental VHS, Toho Video, TG5598R (Hi-Fi Stereo)
 2004.03.26: DVD w/extra, Toho Video TDV2760D (DD 2.0)
Making, original trailer, trailer, promotion images, music video "Voice of Love", Maboroshi's opening, audio commentary 1, audio commentary 2.

External links
 Official website

2003 films
2000s Japanese-language films
Japanese anthology films
Films scored by Kenji Kawai
Films directed by Mamoru Oshii
2000s Japanese films